The FRP Pedestrian Bridge or  in Lleida, Spain is the longest arch bridge made out of standard GFRP pultruded profiles.

The bridge spanning the Madrid-Barcelona high-speed rail link won the international “Footbridge Award 2005” in the category “Technology” for medium span (30m-75m) bridges.

Description
The bridge is entirely made out of GFRP pultruded profiles. The arch configuration was chosen so as to minimize serviceability problems due to the low modulus of elasticity of GFRP profiles. The choice of GFRP was influenced by the fact that the material is an electrical insulator and eliminates magnetic interference with the electrified railway.

The glass fibre reinforced plastic beams and panels used in the footbridge were manufactured in Denmark and assembled in Spain. The total cost of the structure was approximately $0.32million ($2350 per m2).

It was successfully installed in October 2001. The bridge was fabricated in only three months and erected by crane in just three hours.

References

External links
 

 

 

Arch bridges
Tied arch bridges
Bridges in Catalonia
Lleida